Callionymus melanotopterus, the Indonesian flag dragonet, is a species of dragonet native to the Pacific waters of Indonesia where it inhabits estuaries.

References 

M
Fish described in 1851